Wadi Wurayah is a  wadi between the towns of Masafi, Khor Fakkan, and Bidiyah in the United Arab Emirates. It has been designated as Ramsar Wetland of International Importance.

Protected area 

On 16 March 2009, the Wadi Wurayah became the first protected mountain area in the United Arab Emirates, after a three-year campaign by the Emirates Wildlife Society in Association with World Wide Fund for Nature, with the support of HSBC Bank Middle East Limited. In addition to the conservation of the area's delicate ecosystem, EWS-WWF have also set up camera traps to photograph the more elusive wildlife, and arranged field trips for students to help raise awareness of the area.

Flora and fauna 

Wadi Wurayah is home to more than 100 species of mammals, birds, reptiles and amphibians, as well as more than 300 species of plants. It is famous for its scenic waterfall set amid the Hajar Mountains. It has streams and pools dotted around the rocky outcrops. It is one of few remaining places in the world where the endangered Arabian tahr still roams free. Conservationists believe it to be among the last places in the UAE where the Arabian leopard, which has not been seen in the UAE since 1995, still survives. A footprint of a leopard was found here. The same is true for the caracal. The wadi is also home to the Garra barreimiae, a type of freshwater fish that lives only in Al Hajar Mountains. Among the 208 species of plants is a species of wild orchid unique to the area, the Epipactis veratrifolia. In 2018, an Indian crested porcupine was spotted here.

In January 2020, a few Indian fritillaries (Argynnis hyperbius) were found in the park by Binish Roobas, an Indian naturalist based in the UAE, who managed to photograph a male and female. He was visiting the area to survey the diversity of flora and insects, after there had been heavy rainfall in the country from October 2019 to January 2020, along with park ranger Sami Ullah Majeed, biologist Nuri Asmita, and the Chairman of the Dubai Natural History Group, Gary Feulner. It is thought that the fritillaries, which were found flying with members of a physically similar species, the plain tiger (Danaus chrysippus), came here as opportunistic migrants, because of the suitable conditions made by the rainfall, and thatthey would not stay during the summer.

Gallery

See also 
 Al Marmoom Desert Conservation Reserve, Dubai
 Al-Wathba Wetland Reserve, Abu Dhabi
 Dubai Desert Conservation Reserve
 Jebel Hafeet National Park, Abu Dhabi
 List of wadis of the United Arab Emirates
 List of Ramsar wetlands of international importance
 Mangrove National Park, Abu Dhabi
 Ras Al Khor, Dubai
 Sir Bani Yas, Abu Dhabi
 Sir Abu Nu'ayr, Sharjah
 Wildlife of the United Arab Emirates

References

External links 
 Hiking: The Highest Points in the UAE

Geography of the Emirate of Fujairah
Protected areas of the United Arab Emirates
Waterfalls of the United Arab Emirates
Ramsar sites in the United Arab Emirates